Dumarao, officially the Municipality of Dumarao (Capiznon/Hiligaynon: Banwa sang Dumarao), is a 2nd class municipality in the province of Capiz, Philippines. According to the 2020 census, it has a population of 49,506 people.

It was founded in 1580 and established by Spaniards under the advocacy of Our Lady of Snows.

Geography

Barangays
Dumarao is politically subdivided into 33 barangays.

Climate

Demographics

Economy

References

External links
 [ Philippine Standard Geographic Code]
Philippine Census Information

Municipalities of Capiz